Malfunction: The Dressing Down of Janet Jackson is a 2021 American documentary television film, directed by Jodi Gomes and produced by Left/Right. The film focuses on the Super Bowl XXXVIII halftime show controversy in which Justin Timberlake partially exposed American singer Janet Jackson's breast during Timberlake and Jackson's live performance at the end of the halftime show, resulting in substantial backlash against Jackson. After work on Framing Britney Spears, The New York Times reunited with Left/Right on the documentary, and FX and sister service, Hulu, distributed it on linear television and streaming, respectively. The documentary premiered on November 19, 2021. The film was reviewed positively in IndieWire.

References

Janet Jackson
Justin Timberlake
2021 films
2021 television films
American documentary television films
2021 documentary films
Documentary films about singers
Documentary films about women in music
The New York Times
2020s English-language films
2020s American films